Leonel Enrique Campos Linares (born July 17, 1987) is a Venezuelan professional baseball pitcher who is a free agent. He previously played in Major League Baseball (MLB) for the San Diego Padres and Toronto Blue Jays and in Nippon Professional Baseball (NPB) for the Hiroshima Toyo Carp.

Professional career

Minor leagues
Campos began his professional baseball career as a member of the Águilas del Zulia of the Venezuelan Winter League in 2010. In 4 innings pitched, Campos posted a 7.71 earned run average (ERA) and five strikeouts. In 2011, he signed with the San Diego Padres organization and was assigned to the Short Season-A Eugene Emeralds. Campos made only one appearance for the Emeralds in 2011, surrendering four earned runs in two innings. It was later determined that Campos required Tommy John surgery, and he subsequently missed the entire 2012 season recovering. He was assigned to the Class-A Fort Wayne TinCaps to open the 2013 season, and later earned a promotion to the Double-A San Antonio Missions. In 67 total innings, Campos pitched to a 3–1 win–loss record, 1.61 ERA, and 106 strikeouts.

Campos began the 2014 season in Triple-A with the El Paso Chihuahuas. but was sent back to Double-A in May. He remained with the Missions until the end of the minor league season, and finished the year with a 2–7 record, 6.37 ERA, and 108 strikeouts in 82 total innings.

San Diego Padres
Following the completion of the minor league season, Campos was called up by the Padres on September 1, 2014. He made his major league debut on September 3, and made six total appearances for the Padres in September, allowing four earned runs in seven innings. Campos spent the vast majority of the 2015 season in Triple-A El Paso, making only one appearance with the Padres. With the Chihuahuas, Campos pitched to a 2–0 record, 2.90 ERA, and 68 strikeouts in 49 innings. In his one relief appearance for the Padres, Campos allowed one earned run in one inning.

Campos opened the 2016 season in El Paso, and was called up by the Padres in September. He posted a 2–1 record, 4.32 ERA, and 62 strikeouts in 50 total innings with the Chihuahuas, and a 1–0 record, 5.73 ERA, and 24 strikeouts in 22 innings with the Padres.

Toronto Blue Jays
On November 18, 2016, Campos was claimed off waivers by the Toronto Blue Jays. They designated him for assignment on January 23, 2017. Campos cleared waivers and was outrighted to the Triple-A Buffalo Bisons on January 27. He was called up by the Blue Jays on April 22, and sent back down on April 25. He was outrighted to Triple-A on November 6, 2017, and elected free agency the following day.

Hiroshima Toyo Carp
On November 22, 2017, Campos was signed by the Cleveland Indians to a minor league contract with a non-roster invitation to the club's 2018 spring training camp. The Indians granted Campos his release on December 20, and he signed a one-year, $400,000 contract with the Hiroshima Toyo Carp later that day. Campos played only one game and was sent down to the minor league Toyota Carp in the Western League at Iwakuni. On November 20, 2018, Campos became a free agent.

Bravos de León
On July 10, 2021, Campos signed with the Bravos de León of the Mexican League. He was released following the season on October 20, 2021.

See also
 List of Major League Baseball players from Venezuela

References

External links

1987 births
Living people
Águilas del Zulia players
Bravos de León players
Buffalo Bisons (minor league) players
Dunedin Blue Jays players
El Paso Chihuahuas players
Eugene Emeralds players
Fort Wayne TinCaps players
Hiroshima Toyo Carp players
Major League Baseball pitchers
Major League Baseball players from Venezuela
Nippon Professional Baseball pitchers
People from Trujillo (state)
People from Valera
San Antonio Missions players
San Diego Padres players
Toronto Blue Jays players
Venezuelan expatriate baseball players in Canada
Venezuelan expatriate baseball players in Japan
Venezuelan expatriate baseball players in Mexico
Venezuelan expatriate baseball players in the United States
World Baseball Classic players of Venezuela
2017 World Baseball Classic players